Manchester Rusholme was a parliamentary constituency centred on the Rusholme district of Manchester.  It returned one Member of Parliament (MP) to the House of Commons of the Parliament of the United Kingdom, elected by the first past the post system.

History 

The constituency was created by the Representation of the People Act for the 1918 general election, and abolished for the 1950 general election.

Boundaries 
The constituency was created as Manchester, Rusholme Division by the Representation of the People Act 1918, and was defined as consisting of three wards of the county borough of Manchester, namely Levenshulme, Longsight and Rusholme.

The division consisted of areas that had been included with Manchester's municipal boundaries in 1890 and 1909. Since the previous redistribution of seats in 1885, they had formed part of the Stretford Division of Lancashire.

The seat was abolished by the Representation of the People Act 1948, with its area being redistributed between Manchester Ardwick (Longsight), Manchester Gorton (Levenshulme) and Manchester Withington (Rusholme) borough constituencies.

Members of Parliament

Election results

Election in the 1910s

Election in the 1920s

Election in the 1930s

Election in the 1940s
General Election 1940
Another election was due to take place by 1940 but did not take place due to the outbreak of war.
The following candidates had already been selected to fight this election:
Conservative: Edmund Ashworth Radford
Labour: Lester Hutchinson
Liberal: Hilda Buckmaster

References 

 
 

Parliamentary constituencies in Manchester (historic)
Parliamentary constituencies in North West England (historic)
Constituencies of the Parliament of the United Kingdom established in 1918
Constituencies of the Parliament of the United Kingdom disestablished in 1950